Udayarpalayam taluk is a taluk of Ariyalur district of the Indian state of Tamil Nadu. The headquarters of the taluk is the town of Jayankondam.

Demographics
According to the 2011 census, the taluk of Udayarpalayam had a population of 384,800 with 190,974 males and 193,826 females. There were 1015 women for every 1000 men. The taluk had a literacy rate of 65.6. Child population in the age group below 6 was 20,417 males and 17,971 females.

Towns and villages

 Adichanur
 Aiyur
 Alagapuram
 Amanakkanthondi
 Ambapur
 Anaikudam
 Andimadam
 Angarayanallur
 Anikudichan
 Athukurichi
 Ayyappannayakkan Pettai
 Cholamadevi
 Darmasamudram
 Devamangalam
 Devanur
 Edankanni
 Edayar
 Elaiyur-East
 Elaiyur-West
 Elayaperumalnallur
 Eravangudi
 GangaiKonda Cholapuram
 Govindaputhur
 Gunamangalam
 Idayakurichi
 Irugaiyur
 jayankondam
 K. Vallam
 Kachi Perumal
 Kadambur
 Kaduvettankurichy
 Kallathur
 Kaluvan Thondi
 Karai Kurichy
 Karukai
 Kasan Kottai
 Kattagaram-North
 Kattagaram-South
 Kattathur-North
 Kattathur-South
 Kilanatham
 Kodali Karuppur
 Kodangudi-North
 Kodangudi-South
 Kodukkur
 Kovil Valkai
 Kulothunganallur
 Kundaveli-East
 Kundaveli-West
 Kuruvalapparkoil
 Kuvagam
 Kuvathur
 Managathy
 Marudur
 Melur
 Muthuservamadam
 Nagam Panthal
 Nayaganai Periyal
 Nedavalur-East
 Nedavalur-South
 Olayur
 Padanilai
 Pappakudi-North
 Pappakudi-South
 Parukkal (East)
 Periyakrishnapuram
 Periyavalayam
 Pichanur
 Pilichikuzhi
 Piranjeri
 Porpathintha Nallur
 Rangiyam
 Saluppai
 Sathampady
 Silambur
 Siluvacheri
 Sirukadambur
 Solankurichi
 Sripuranthan
 Sriraman
 Suriyamanal
 Suttamalli
 T.Paluvur
 Taludalamedu
 Thandalai
 Thathanur
 Thenkatchi Perumal Nathan
 Thirukalapur
 Udayanatham
 Udayarpalayam
 Udayavarathianur
 Ulkottai
 Ulliyakudi
 Valaikurichy
 Vanathirayanpattinam
 Vangudi
 Varadarajampettai
 Variyankaval
 Vembukudy
 Venmankondan (East, West)
 Vethiyarvettu or Vettiyarvettu
 Vettiyarvettu-Rf
 Vilandhai
 Viluthudiyan

Brihadeeswarar Temple, Gangaikondacholapuram, Jayankondam
The district became famous in 2008, when theft of eight idols were discovered from a 9th-century Chola Brihadeeswarar Temple at Sripuranthan Village was discovered by Archaeological Survey of India(ASI) Government of India officials. One of these idols, the Sripuranthan Natarajan Idol found its way to the National Gallery of Australia. Two of the stolen statues were consequently returned and are now displayed in the Government Museum at Kumbakonam.

References 

Taluks of Ariyalur district